The 2011 Historic Formula One Championship (also known as Thoroughbred Grand Prix) was the seventeenth season of the Historic Formula One Championship. It began at Hockenheim on April 17 and ended at Jarama on October 30.

It was won by John Delane from The United States driving a Tyrrell 002 despite not winning any of the ten races.

Calendar

Drivers

References

Historic Formula One Championship
Historic Formula One